Mary Ethel Barnard (December 6, 1909 – August 25, 2001) was an American poet, biographer and Greek-to-English translator. She is known for her elegant rendering of the works of Sappho, a translation which has never gone out of print.

Paideuma: A Journal Devoted to Ezra Pound Scholarship, Issue 94, was exclusively dedicated to her work and her correspondence with Pound. Barnard won a Levinson Award of Poetry from Poetry Magazine in 1935, and an Elliston Award for her Collected Poems, a Western States Book Award in 1986, (for Time and the White Tigress). Among other honors were: the Washington State Governor's Award for achievement in the literary arts, and the May Sarton Award for Poetry from the New England Poetry Club in 1987.

Biography 

Barnard was born in Vancouver, Washington to Samuel Melvin and Bertha Hoard Barnard. Her father worked in the timber industry; growing up, she saw much of the backwoods  in the vicinity as she accompanied her father to logging camps. She graduated from Reed College, just south of the Columbia River in Portland, Oregon, in 1932. Barnard worked for a few years as a social worker for the Emergency Relief Administration, and while curator of The Poetry Collection at the Lockwood Memorial Library (University at Buffalo, New York) arranged readings and amassed the writing of many modern poets.

Barnard won several Yaddo residencies circa 1936–38. Some of her first poetry was published during the years 1936 - 1940, in Five Young American Poets, published by New Directions Publishing founded by James Laughlin. She worked from 1945 to 1950 as research assistant for Carl van Doren, biographer of Benjamin Franklin and generalist historian of Americana; she is acknowledged as having done most of the research on a biography of Jane Mecom, Franklin's youngest sister. Van Doren and Barnard had a common interest in the poet Elinor Wylie. Barnard also worked as a freelance writer. Barnard was also a member of the American Association of University Women (AAUW).

Barnard was mentored via airmail from Italy by Ezra Pound after she sent him six poems, and was introduced to the likes of William Carlos Williams and Marianne Moore. This generated a lifetime of lengthy correspondence with the former in addition to comprehensive instruction on the art of poetry from Pound. Pound encouraged Barnard to use translations to hone her poetic abilities. Pound also encouraged Barnard to visit Europe, meet H.D. (which did not happen despite pressure from Pound), and generally witness the continental European scene.  In 1958, inspired by Salvatore Quasimodo's anthology Greci Lirici, Barnard published Sappho: A New Translation, with the encouragement of Pound, whom she sent the first drafts of the work.

She returned to Vancouver after fifteen years on the East Coast and continued to write, mostly original poetry and prose, until her death.

Works 

 A Few Poems (1952)
 Sappho: A New Translation (University of California Press' 1958)
 Mythmakers (Ohio University Press, 1966)
 Collected Poems (Breitenbush Books, 1979, introduction by William Stafford)
 Three Fables (Breitenbush Books, 1983)
 Assault on Mt. Helicon: A Literary Memoir (University of California Press, 1984)
 Time and the White Tigress (Breitenbush Books, 1986, linocuts by Anita Bigelow)
 Nantucket Genesis: The Tale of My Tribe (1988, memoir in verse)

See also 
 'Mary Barnard' is a cultivar of Iris unguicularis

Works cited

References

External links 
 Mary Barnard page
 Photo of bespectacled Barnard
 Paideuma 
 Brief biography by Elizabeth Bell
Mary Barnard Papers. Yale Collection of American Literature, Beinecke Rare Book and Manuscript Library.

1909 births
2001 deaths
American women poets
Greek–English translators
Reed College alumni
Poets from Oregon
Writers from Vancouver, Washington
20th-century American poets
20th-century American women writers
20th-century American biographers
American women biographers
20th-century American translators